Wik-Ngathan, or Wik-Iinjtjenj (Wik-Iinychanya), is a Paman language spoken on the Cape York Peninsula of Queensland, Australia, by the Wik-Ngathan people. It is closely related to the other Wik-Ngathan language, Wik-Ngatharr and more distantly to the other Wik languages. In 1981 there were 130 speakers.

A dictionary of Wik-Ngathan has been compiled by Peter Sutton.

References 

Wik languages
Endangered indigenous Australian languages in Queensland
Definitely endangered languages